Hymes is a surname. Notable people with the surname include:

 Dell Hymes (1927–2009), American linguist, anthropologist, and folklorist
 Edward Hymes (1908–1962), American bridge player
 Laurie Hymes, American voice actress
 Randy Hymes (born 1979), American football player